Colegio Albania is an American international PK-12 private school in the Mushaisa area in Cerrejón, within Albania, La Guajira, Colombia, serving students from age 1 1/2 to the end of high school. It is a member of the Association of American Schools in South America.

History

It began offering the IB Diploma Program on June 9, 2010, the IB Middle Years Program on May 17, 2011, and the IB Primary Years program on November 24, 2015.

Student body
 there were 429 students, with 60 of them living in places other than Mushaisa. Five were dual citizens of Colombia and another country each, three were U.S. citizens, and the remainder were Colombian citizens.

References

External links
 Colegio Albania

American international schools in Colombia